Notonomus dimorphicus is a species of ground beetle in the subfamily Pterostichinae. It was described by Darlington in 1961.

References

Notonomus
Beetles described in 1961